Snooker world rankings 1991/1992: The professional world rankings for the top 64 snooker players in the 1991–92 season are listed below. There were 146 ranked players with points on the full list. Stephen Hendry was ranked first, with 85 ranking points, ahead of Steve Davis with 57 and Jimmy White with 51. Bill Werbeniuk was in 146th place.

References

1991
Rankings 1992
Rankings 1991